The 2016–17 season was Parma Calcio 1913's first season in the Lega Pro since the 1980s. It ended in a second successive promotion.

References

Parma Calcio 1913 seasons
Parma